Tuwuh Adijatitesih Amaranggana (born 8 July 1975) is an Indonesian actress, model, and singer better known as Amara or Mara.

Career 
Amara was born in Jakarta, on 8 July 1975. She was a teenager in 1989, when she started her career as a model for the Indonesian fashion magazine Covergirl. he had plunged into an advertisement model in several advertisements and video clip models for several musicians. Her mother, Itje Komar, works as a producer for a recording studio called "Bintang Gemilang Jaya Sakti" in Jakarta.

In 1996 she founded with Arie Widiawan, and her future husband Frans Mohede, the vocal trio, Lingua. An Indonesian musical group of country pop. Despite the great success that their group has obtained in Indonesia, the group ends in oblivion in the early 2000s. It has been said repeatedly that their decline was cause as a result of the Asian financial crisis.

She has since followed a career as an actress, having received many proposals for roles in soap operas and TV movies. She obtained her first main role in the TV series  Mahligai Diatas Pasir  ( Above the Sand Castle ) with actor Adjie Massaid, or it embodied a newly installed girl Jakarta and attempts to improve his life after becoming pregnant following a rape. She is a close friend of the actress Michelle Ziudith, they already play together in the soap opera Sajadah Cinta Maryam ( Sajadah Love Maryam ) and in Love in Paris in which she played the role of her own mother.

Under the influence of her husband, Frans Mohede, which is martial arts expert, Amara became a practitioner Muay Thai since 2002. Together, they have already, opened training centers Muay Thai to Jakarta and Bali, to help spread the sport in Indonesia.

Personal life 
After living more than eight years together, Amara married the artist Frans Mohede to Hong Kong on December 1, 1999. As Indonesian law prohibits interfaith marriage since 1974, this union was to save foreign civil status to be legally recognized.

Marriage has received parental disapproval of Amara who refuse to attend due to the difference in religion. Amara, is a Sunni Muslim and Mohede, is a Protestant Christian. Despite their differences they remain popular for being a couple, very tolerant and very respectful, Mohede and Amara are known to support each other, in their religious rites and practices.

Their controversial marriage then produced three children: Mahija Nathaniel Sambarana Aryantawira (born on June 8, 2004), Janitra Nathaniel Sambawikrama (born on September 8, 2006) and Rajaswa Nathaniel (born on October 17, 2008).

Filmography

Film 
 Misi: 1511 (Mission: 1511; 2006)
 Tiger Boy (2015)
 ILY from 38.000 Ft (2016)

Film television 
 Orde Cinta (Order of Love; 2001)
 Wajah Kita (Our Face; 2005)
 Hatiku Menangis Melihat Anakku Benci Aku (My heart wept to see my son hates me; 2015)

Soap operas

Discography

With Lingua

Studio album 

 Bila Kuingat (1996)
 Bintang (1998)
 Mampu Bertahan (2016)

Singles 
 Good Times (2015)
 Arti Sebuah Keangkuhan (2017)
 Jangan Kau Henti (2019 version) (2019)
 Bila Kuingat (2019 version) (2019)
 Temani Malamku (2020)

Advertisements
 Sunsilk Premium Scalp Care
 Sunsilk Jeruk Nipis
 Sunsilk Premium Hot Oil
 Packaging Sunsilk
 Promag
 SilverQueen
 Minuman Sari Asem 
 Ligna Furniture 
 Bisolvon extra

References

External links
  Profil Amara Kapanlagi.com
 Instagram Amara

1975 births
21st-century Indonesian actresses
Indonesian television actresses
Living people
Indonesian female mixed martial artists
Female Muay Thai practitioners
Indonesian female models
Actresses from Jakarta
Indonesian dance musicians
21st-century Indonesian women singers
Indonesian soul singers
Indonesian country singers
Indonesian pop singers
Indonesian female dancers
Singers from Jakarta
Indonesian Muslims
Javanese people
20th-century Indonesian women singers